A pika (archaically spelled pica) is a small, mountain-dwelling mammal found in Asia and North America. With short limbs, very round body, an even coat of fur, and no external tail, they resemble their close relative, the rabbit, but with short, rounded ears.

Pikas prefer rocky slopes and graze on a range of plants, mostly grasses, flowers and young stems. In the autumn they pull hay, soft twigs and other stores of food into their burrows to eat during the long, cold winter. The pika is also known as the whistling hare because of its high-pitched alarm call when diving into its burrow.

The name ‘pika’ appears to be derived from the Tungus piika, and the scientific name Ochotona is from the Mongolian word ogutun-a, оготно, which means pika. It is used for any member of the Ochotonidae, a family within the order of lagomorphs which also includes the Leporidae (rabbits and hares). Only one genus, Ochotona (/ɑːkəˈtoʊnə/ or /ɑːʧəˈtoʊnə/), is extant within the family, covering 37 species, though many fossil genera are known. Another species, the Sardinian pika, belonging to the separate genus Prolagus, has become extinct within the last 2000 years owing to human activity.

The two species found in North America are the American pika, found primarily in the mountains of the western United States and far southwestern Canada, and the collared pika of northern British Columbia, the Yukon, western Northwest Territories and Alaska.

Habitat

Pikas are native to cold climates in Asia and North America. Most species live on rocky mountainsides, where  numerous crevices are available for their shelter, although some pikas also construct crude burrows. A few burrowing species are native to open steppe land. In the mountains of Eurasia pikas often share their burrows with snowfinches, which build their nests there.  Pikas require cold temperatures to live, and can die if exposed to temperatures above . Changing temperatures have forced some pika populations to restrict their ranges to even higher elevations.

Characteristics

Pikas are small mammals, with short limbs and rounded ears. Like rabbits, after eating they initially produce soft green feces, which they eat again to take in further nutrition before producing the final solid fecal pellets. Collared pikas have been known to store dead birds in their burrows for food during winter and eat the feces of other animals.

These animals are herbivores and feed on a wide variety of plant matter, including forbs, grasses, sedges, shrub twigs, moss and lichens. As with other lagomorphs, pikas have gnawing incisors and no canines, although they have fewer molars than rabbits; they have a dental formula of: . Another similarity that pikas share with other lagomorphs is that the bottom of their paws are covered with fur and therefore lack paw pads.

Rock-dwelling pikas have small litters of fewer than five young, whilst the burrowing species tend to give birth to more young and to breed more frequently, possibly owing to a greater availability of resources in their native habitats. The young are born after a gestation period of between 25 and 30 days.

Activity

Pikas are active during daylight (diurnal) or twilight hours (crepuscular), with higher-elevation species generally being more active during the daytime. They show their peak activity just before the winter season. Pikas do not hibernate so they generally spend time during the summer collecting and storing food for the winter. Each rock-dwelling pika stores its own ‘haypile’ of dried vegetation, whilst burrowing species often share food stores with their burrow mates. Haying behavior is more prominent at higher elevations. Many of the vocalizations and social behaviors that pikas exhibit are related to haypile defense.

The impact of human activity on the tundra ecosystems where pikas live has been recorded dating back to the 1970s. Rather than hibernate during winter, pikas forage for grasses and other forms of plant matter and stash these findings in protected dens in a process called 'haying' which they sustain themselves with during winter seasons. Sometimes pikas think that humans are predators, so they sometimes respond to humans as they do to other species that may actually be preying on the pikas. Such interactions with humans have been linked to pikas having reduced amounts of foraging time, consequentially limiting the amount of food they can stockpile for winter months. Pikas are unable to withstand surrounding temperatures above  so they must spend their time in shaded regions and out of direct sunlight when temperatures are high.  A link has also been found between temperature increases and lost foraging time, where for every increase of 1°C to the ambient temperature in alpine landscapes home to pikas those pikas lose 3% of their foraging time.

Eurasian pikas commonly live in family groups and share duties of gathering food and keeping watch. Some species are territorial. North American pikas (O. princeps and O. collaris) are asocial, leading solitary lives outside the breeding season.

Dialects
Pikas have distinct calls, which vary in duration. The call can be short and quick, a little longer and more drawn out or long songs. The short calls are an example of geographic variation. The pikas determine the appropriate time to make short calls by listening for cues for sound localization. The calls are used for individual recognition, predator warning signals, territory defense, or as a way to attract the opposite sex. There are also different calls depending on the season. In the spring the songs become more frequent during the breeding season. In late summer the vocalizations become short calls. Through various studies, the acoustic characteristics of the vocalizations can be a useful taxonomic tool.

Lifespan
The average lifespan of pikas in the wild is roughly seven years. A pika's age may be determined by the number of adhesion lines on the periosteal bone on the lower jaw. The lifespan does not differ between the sexes.

Species

The 34 species currently recognized are:
 Order Lagomorpha
 Family Ochotonidae: pikas
 Genus Ochotona
 Subgenus Conothoa: mountain pikas
 Chinese red pika, O. erythrotis
 Forrest's pika, O. forresti
 Gaoligong pika (O. gaoligongensis) and black pika (O. nigritia) are now thought to be conspecific with O. forresti
 Glover's pika, O. gloveri
Muli pika (O. muliensis) is now thought to be conspecific with O. gloveri
 Ili pika, O. iliensis
 Koslov's pika, O. koslowi
 Ladak pika, O. ladacensis
 Large-eared pika, O. macrotis
 Royle's pika, O. roylei
Himalayan pika (O. himalayana) is now thought to be conspecific with O. roylei
 Turkestan red pika, O. rutila
Subgenus Alienauroa
  Yellow pika, O. huanglongensis
  Sacred pika, O. sacraria
  Flat-headed pika, O. flatcalvariam
Subgenus Ochotona: shrub-steppe pikas
 Gansu pika or gray pika, O. cansus
 Plateau pika or black-lipped pika, O. curzoniae
 Daurian pika, O. dauurica
 Nubra pika, O. nubrica
 Steppe pika, O. pusilla
Qionglai pika, O. qionglaiensis
 Afghan pika, O. rufescens
Sijin pika, O. sikimaria
Tsing-ling pika, O. syrinx
 Moupin pika, O. thibetana
 Thomas's pika, O. thomasi
Subgenus Pika: northern pikas
 Alpine pika or Altai pika, O. alpina
 Helan Shan pika or silver pika, O. argentata
 Collared pika, O. collaris
Korean pika, O. coreana
 Hoffmann's pika, O.  hoffmanni
 Northern pika or Siberian pika, O. hyperborea
Manchurian pika, O. mantchurica
Kazakh pika, O. opaca
 Pallas's pika, O. pallasii
 American pika, O. princeps
 Turuchan pika, O. turuchanensis

Extinct species
Many fossil forms of Ochotona are described in the literature, from the Miocene epoch to the early Holocene (extinct species) and present (16.4-0 Ma). They lived in Europe, Asia, and North America.Some species listed below are common for Eurasia and North America (O. gromovi, O. tologoica, O. zazhigini, and probably O. whartoni).

 Eurasia
 large forms
 †Ochotona chowmincheni (China: Baode area, late Miocene)
 †Ochotona gromovi (Asia, Pliocene, see also North America)
 †Ochotona gudrunae (China: Shanxi, early Pleistocene)
 †Ochotona guizhongensis (Tibet, late Miocene)
 †Ochotona lagreli (China: Inner Mongolia, late Miocene to late Pliocene)
 †Ochotona magna (China, early Pleistocene)
 †Ochotona tologoica (Transbaikalia, Pliocene, see also North America)
 †Ochotona transcaucasica (Transcaucasia: eastern Georgia and Azerbaijan, Transbaikal and probably southern Europe, early to late Pleistocene)
 †Ochotona ursui (Romania, Pliocene)
 †Ochotona zasuchini (Transbaikalia, Pleistocene)
 †Ochotona zazhigini (Asia, Pliocene, see also North America)
 †Ochotona zhangi (China, Pleistocene)
medium-sized forms
 †Ochotona agadjianiani (Asia, Pliocene)
 †Ochotona antiqua (Moldavia, Ukraine, and the Russian Plain, Caucasus, and probably Rhodes, late Miocene to Pliocene)
 †Ochotona azerica (Transcaucasia: Azerbaijan, middle Pliocene)
 †Ochotona lingtaica (Asia, Pliocene)
 †Ochotona dodogolica (Asia: western Transbaikalia, Pleistocene)
 †Ochotona nihewanica (China: Hebei, early Pleistocene)
 †Ochotona plicodenta (Asia, Pliocene)
 †Ochotona polonica (Europe: Poland, Germany, France, Pliocene)
 small-sized forms
 †Ochotona bazarovi (Asia, upper Pliocene)
 †Ochotona dehmi (Germany: Schernfeld, Pleistocene)
 †Ochotona filippovi (Siberia, Pleistocene)
 †Ochotona gracilis (Asia, Pliocene)
 †Ochotona horaceki (Slovakia: Honce, Pleistocene)
 †Ochotona minor (China, late Miocene)
 †Ochotona sibirica (Asia, Pliocene)
 †Ochotona valerotae (France: Valerots site, Pleistocene)
 †Ochotona youngi (Asia, Pliocene)and others.
 other examples
 †Ochotona agadzhaniani (Transcaucasia: Armenia, Pliocene)
 †Ochotona alaica (Asia: Kyrgyzstan, Pleistocene)
 †Ochotona (Proochotona) eximia (Moldova, Ukraine, Russia, Kazakhstan, Miocene to Pliocene)
 †Ochotona (Proochotona) gigas (Ukraine, Pliocene)
 †Ochotona gureevi (Transbaikalia, middle Pliocene)
 †Ochotona hengduanshanensis (China, Pleistocene)
 †Ochotona intermedia (Asia, Pliocene)
 †Ochotona (Proochotona) kalfaense (Europe: Moldova, Miocene)
 †Ochotona (Proochotona) kirgisica (Asia: Kyrgyzstan, Pliocene)
 †Ochotona kormosi (Hungary, Pleistocene)
 †Ochotona (Proochotona) kurdjukovi (Asia: Kyrgyzstan, Pliocene)
 †Ochotona largerli (Georgia, Pleistocene)
 †Ochotona lazari (Ukraine, Pleistocene)
 †Ochotona mediterranensis (Turkey, Pliocene)
 †Ochotona ozansoyi (Turkey, Miocene)
 †Ochotona pseudopusilla (Ukraine and Russian Plain, Pleistocene)
 †Ochotona spelaeus (Ukraine, late Pleistocene)
 †Ochotona tedfordi (China: Yushe Basin, late Miocene)
 †Ochotona cf. whartoni (Irkutsk Oblast and Yakutia, Pleistocene, see also North America)
 †Ochotona zabiensis (southern Poland, early Pleistocene)
 †Ochotona sp. (Greece: Maritsa, Pliocene)
 †Ochotona sp. (Hungary: Ostramos, Pleistocene)
 †Ochotona sp. (Siberia, Pleistocene)
 †Ochotona sp. (Yakutia, Pleistocene)
 North America
 †Ochotona gromovi (US: Colorado, Pliocene, see also Eurasia)
 †Ochotona spanglei (US, late Miocene or early Pliocene)
 †Ochotona tologoica (US: Colorado, Pliocene, see also Eurasia)
 †Ochotona whartoni (giant pika, US, Canada, Pleistocene to early Holocene, see also Eurasia)
 †Ochotona wheatleyi (US: Alaska, Pliocene, late Pleistocene)
 †Ochotona zazhigini (US: Colorado, Pleistocene, see also Eurasia)
 extinct small pikas similar to the O. pusilla group (Pleistocene)

Paleontologists have also described multiple forms of pika not referred to specific species (Ochotona indet.) or not certainly identified (O. cf. antiqua, O. cf. cansus, O. cf. daurica, O. cf. eximia, O. cf. gromovi, O. cf. intermedia, O. cf. koslowi, O. cf. lagrelii, O. cf. nihewanica). The statuses of Ochotona (Proochotona) kirgisica and O. spelaeus are uncertain.

The "pusilla" group of pikas is characterized by archaic (plesiomorphic) cheek teeth and small size.

The North American species migrated from Eurasia. They invaded the New World twice:

 O.  spanglei during the latest Miocene or early Pliocene, followed by a roughly three-million-year-long gap in the known North American pikas record
O.  whartoni (giant pika) and small pikas via the Bering Land Bridge during the earliest Pleistocene

Ochotona cf. whartoni and small pikas of the O. pusilla group are also known from Siberia. The extant, endemic North American species appeared in the Pleistocene. The North American collared pika (O. collaris) and American pika (O. princeps) have been suggested to have descended from the same ancestor as the steppe pika (O. pusilla).

The range of Ochotona was larger in the past, with both extinct and extant species inhabiting Western Europe and Eastern North America, areas that are currently free of pikas. Pleistocene fossils of the extant steppe pika O. pusilla currently native to Asia have been found also in many countries of Europe from the United Kingdom to Russia and from Italy to Poland, and the Asiatic extant northern pika O. hyperborea in one location in the middle Pleistocene United States.

Other genera of ochotonids (currently living only Ochotonidae) include except Ochotona (pika) extinct †Albertona, †Alloptox, †Amphilagus, †Australagomys, †Austrolagomys, †Bellatona, †Bellatonoides, †Bohlinotona, †Cuyamalagus, †Desmatolagus, †Eurolagus, †Gripholagomys, †Gymnesicolagus, †Hesperolagomys, †Heterolagus, †Kenyalagomys, †Lagopsis, †Marcuinomys, †Ochotonoides, †Ochotonoma, †Oklahomalagus, †Oreolagus, †Paludotona, †Piezodus, †Plicalagus, †Pliolagomys, †Prolagus, †Proochotona (syn. Ochotona), †Pseudobellatona, †Ptychoprolagus, †Russellagus, †Sinolagomys and †Titanomys. The earliest one is Desmatolagus (middle Eocene to Miocene, 42.5–14.8 Ma), usually included in the Ochotonidae, sometimes in Leporidae or in neither ochotonid nor leporid stem-lagomorphs.

Ochotonids appeared in Asia between the late Eocene and the early Oligocene, and continued to develop along with increased distribution of C3 grasses in previously forest dominated areas under the "climatic optimum" from the late Oligocene to middle Miocene. They thrived in Eurasia, North America, and even Africa. The peak of their diversity occurred during the period from the early Miocene to middle Miocene, most of them became extinct during the transition from the Miocene to Pliocene, what was accompanied by diversity increase in the leporids. It has been proposed that this switch between ochotonids and larger leporids was caused by expansion of C4 plants (particularly the Poaceae) related to global cooling in the late Miocene, since extant pikas reveal a strong preference for C3 plants (Asteraceae, Rosaceae, and Fabaceae, many of them C3). Replacement of large areas of forests by open grassland first started probably in North America and is called sometimes "nature's green revolution".

Notes

References

Additional references of the Paleobiology Database

Further reading

External links

 The trek of the pika, by Michael Morris, Parks Canada, Mount Revelstoke and Glacier National Parks. (includes sound file)

Extant Burdigalian first appearances